Yisha'ayahu Schwager (born in Poland, 10 February 1946, death in Israel, 31 August 2000) was an Israeli footballer.

1970 World Cup
Schwager was a member of the Israel squad that participated in the World Cup finals in Mexico. During a group play match against Italy, Schwager was given the task of marking Luigi Riva, which he did so well that he received praise from the media back home. In 2000, Schwager died from a  heart attack.

Schwager also played at the 1968 Summer Olympics.

External links
Profile and biography of Yisha'ayahu Schwager on Maccabi Haifa's official website

Footnotes

1946 births
2000 deaths
Israeli footballers
Israel international footballers
Maccabi Haifa F.C. players
1970 FIFA World Cup players
Footballers at the 1968 Summer Olympics
Olympic footballers of Israel
Footballers from Haifa
Polish emigrants to Israel
Association football defenders